Daniel Bona (born 1 June 1969) is a Romanian former footballer and currently the assistant manager of Liga III side SR Brașov.

 In his career, as a footballer, Daniel Bona played for teams such as Tractorul Brașov, Corvinul Hunedoara, Metrom Brașov  and Precizia Săcele. As a manager, Bona is well known in Romania for his performances as the manager of teams based in Brașov County, especially for the period spent at Corona Brașov.

Player career
Daniel Bona was born in Hunedoara and grew up in the academy of Corvinul Hunedoara, academy that produced over time many important players, such as Remus Vlad, Michael Klein, Ioan Andone, Romulus Gabor, Dorin Mateuț, Mircea Rednic or Bogdan Lobonț, among others. After a period spent at Rapid Miercurea Ciuc, Bona made his debut at Divizia B in 1993, for Tractorul Brașov.

In 1994, he moved back to Corvinul Hunedoara, but after half of season Daniel return to Brașov County, where he spent the rest of his career, at teams such as Metrom Brașov and Precizia Săcele.

At Precizia Săcele, Bona changed its position in the squad, from midfielder to forward and had some great seasons with the "red and blacks", winning the top scorer trophy for Divizia B, at the end of the 1997–98 edition. Also, at the end of the 1996–97 season he was ranked 2nd in the goalscorers table, after Claudiu Niculescu. Bona's career ended suddenly in 2000, after a severe injury, so he never got to play in the top-flight.

Manager career
Daniel Bona started his football manager career at the Precizia Săcele Academy, in 2000, then in 2003 he was promoted as the manager of the first squad, Divizia B side at that time. Bona maintained Precizia in the second league after they were ranked 11th, 10th and 6th, but in 2006 he accepted a contract from 4th league club Unirea Tărlungeni.

Bona achieved a promotion to Liga III, with the team near Brașov, subsequently signing a contract with Corona Brașov, 5th tier club at that time. The period spent by Bona at Corona remains memorable for his career, Corona promoted from the Liga V to Liga I, within 5 years. After promotion, Bona was named assistant coach, but returned as the manager of the team in May 2014, then managing the squad in the top-flight for almost a month, until their relegation.

Bona returned to Unirea Tărlungeni in the summer of 2014 and had notableresults, maintaining the small club, at the level of the second tier. In 2016, he moved to Olimpic Cetate Râșnov (3rd tier club), then in 2018 to AFC Hărman (3rd tier).

Honours

Manager
Unirea Tărlungeni
Liga IV Brașov: Winner (1) 2006–07

Corona Brașov
Liga II: Winner (1) 2012–13
Liga III: Winner (1) 2011–12
Liga IV – Brașov County: Winner (1) 2009–10
Liga V – Brașov County: Winner (1) 2008–09

Other performances
Precizia Săcele
Divizia B: Top scorer 1997–98

References

External links
 
 
 
 Dan Bona at labtof.ro

1969 births
Living people
Sportspeople from Hunedoara
Romanian footballers
Association football midfielders
Association football forwards
Liga II players
FK Csíkszereda Miercurea Ciuc players
CS Corvinul Hunedoara players
Romanian football managers
CSM Corona Brașov (football) managers